The 1990 Boston University Terriers football team was an American football team that represented Boston University as a member of the Yankee Conference during the 1990 NCAA Division I-AA football season. In their first season under head coach Dan Allen, the Terriers compiled a 5–6 record (4–4 against conference opponents), finished sixth in the Yankee Conference, and were outscored by a total of 273 to 246.

Schedule

References

Boston University
Boston University Terriers football seasons
Boston University Terriers football